Privlaka may refer to:

Privlaka, Vukovar-Syrmia County, Croatia
Privlaka, Zadar County, Croatia

See also
Prevlaka